The shortwings are colourful medium-sized mostly insectivorous birds in the genus Brachypteryx of the thrush family Turdidae, although some taxonomists place them in the Old World Flycatcher family Muscicapidae. They show strong sexual plumage dimorphism. All are southeast Asian species.

Most shortwings are place in the genus Brachypteryx.
 Rusty-bellied shortwing, Brachypteryx hyperythra
 Lesser shortwing, Brachypteryx leucophrys
 White-browed shortwing, Brachypteryx montana

Three other species, formerly placed in Brachypteryx, are now in two other genera.
 Great shortwing, Heinrichia calligyna
 Nilgiri blue robin (also known at Nilgiri shortwing), Myiomela major
 Gould's shortwing, Heteroxenicus stellata

Turdidae
Birds by common name